Events from the year 1484 in Ireland.

Incumbent
Lord: Richard III

Events
June 14 – Walter Fitzsimon is appointed Archbishop of Dublin, an office which he will hold until his death in 1511.
July–August – Gearóid Mór FitzGerald, 8th Earl of Kildare, Lord Deputy of Ireland, attends the English court.
August 20 – Giolla Pádraig (son of Éamonn mac Thomáis Óig, Mág Uidhir), tánaiste of Fir Manach, is killed by his five brothers, leading to dynastic tension.
August 21 – John de la Pole, 1st Earl of Lincoln, is appointed Lieutenant in Ireland by his uncle Richard III of England.
September – Thomás Bairéad, Bishop of Annaghdown, is commissioned by the King to treat with Conn mac Enri Ó Néill, lord of Tír Eógain, and Hiberno-Normans.
September 28 – St. Nicholas' Church, Galway, is raised to the status of a collegiate church by Donatus Ó Muireadhaigh, Archbishop of Tuam.
October 15 – Great Council (sitting of the Parliament of Ireland) at Naas.
November – Réamonn mac Mathghamhna, king of Airgíalla, dies in captivity at Drogheda and is succeeded by his nephew Aodh Óg.
December 15 – The city of Galway is granted a royal charter and mayoralty by Richard III of England.
An Irish province of the Dominican Order is established.

Births

Deaths

References

 
1480s in Ireland
Ireland
Years of the 15th century in Ireland